Pale  is a town in Pale Township, Yinmabin District, in southern Sagaing Region, Myanmar.  It is the administrative seat of Pale Township. Pale is at a crossroads with one route going north to Yinmabin, one running west to Mindaingbin, and a third running south-east to Kyadet.

Notes

External links
Satellite map at Maplandia.com

Township capitals of Myanmar
Populated places in Sagaing Region